This article traces the historical development of the dioceses and cathedrals of the Church of England. It is customary in England to name each diocese after the city where its cathedral is located. Occasionally, when the bishop's seat has been moved from one city to another, the diocese may retain both names, for example Bath and Wells. More recently, where a cathedral is in a small or little-known city, the diocesan name has been changed to include the name of a nearby larger city: thus the cathedral in Southwell now serves the diocese of Southwell and Nottingham, and Ripon Cathedral was in Ripon and Leeds from 1999 until 2014. Cathedrals, like other churches, are dedicated to a particular saint or holy object, or Christ himself, but are commonly referred to by the name of the city where they stand. A cathedral is, simply, the church where the bishop has his chair or "cathedra".

The forty-two dioceses of the Church of England are administrative territorial units each governed by a bishop. Forty-one dioceses cover England, the Isle of Man, the Channel Islands, the Isles of Scilly, and a small part of Wales. One diocese, the Diocese in Europe, is also a part of the Church of England (rather than a separate Anglican church such as the Church in Wales), and covers the whole of mainland Europe, the countries of Morocco and Turkey, and the territory of the former Soviet Union.

The structure of the dioceses within the Church of England was initially inherited from the Catholic Church as part of the English Reformation. During the Reformation, a number of new dioceses were founded. No new English or Welsh dioceses were then created until the middle of the 19th century, when dioceses were founded mainly in response to the growing population, especially in the northern industrial cities.

From 1787, the Anglican church also erected 41 dioceses outside these isles (see § colonial dioceses); these were part of the Church of England until they were separated from the home Church in 1863. From 1801 until 1871, the dioceses of Ireland were also part of the United Church of England and Ireland. In 1920 (by the Welsh Church Act 1914), the Welsh dioceses were separated to form the Church in Wales.

The last dioceses were created in 1927. The 42 dioceses are divided between two Provinces: the Province of Canterbury (with 30 dioceses) and the Province of York (with 12 dioceses). The archbishops of Canterbury and York have pastoral oversight over the bishops within their province, along with certain other rights and responsibilities.

History

The history of the cathedrals in Great Britain differs somewhat from that of their European continental counterparts. British cathedrals have always been fewer in number than those of Italy, France, and other parts of Europe, while the buildings themselves have tended to be much larger. While France, at the time of the French Revolution, had 136 cathedrals, England had 27. Because of a ruling that no cathedral could be built in a village, any town in which a cathedral was located was elevated to city status, regardless of its size. To this day several large English cathedrals are located in small "cathedral cities", notably Wells and Ely Cathedrals, both of which rank among the greatest works of English Medieval architecture.

Early organisation
In earlier times, populations were sparsely spread and towns were few. The population of the kingdom of England in the 11th century is estimated at between one and two million, with Lincolnshire, East Anglia, and East Kent the most densely populated areas; in other parts of the country many villages had been razed by the conquest armies.  Instead of exercising jurisdiction over geographical areas, many of the bishops were linked to tribes or peoples, as the bishops of the South Saxons, the West Saxons, the Somersætas, etc. The cathedra of such a bishop was often migratory.

In 1075 a council was held in London, under the presidency of Archbishop Lanfranc, which, reciting the decrees of the council of Sardica held in 347 and that of Laodicea held in 360 on this matter, ordered the bishop of the South Saxons to remove his see from Selsey to Chichester; the Wiltshire and Dorset bishop to remove his cathedra from Sherborne to Old Sarum, and the Mercian bishop, whose cathedral was then at Lichfield, to transfer it to Chester. Traces of the tribal and migratory system may still be noted in the designations of the Irish see of Meath (where the result has been that there is now no cathedral church) and Ossory, the cathedral church of which is at Kilkenny. Some of the Scottish sees were also migratory.

Late Middle Ages

 
Between 1075 and the 15th century, the cathedrals of England were almost evenly divided between those ruled by secular canons headed by a dean and those ruled by monastic orders headed by a prior, all of which were Benedictine, except Carlisle, which was Augustinian. Two cathedrals, Bath and Coventry, shared their sees with Wells and Lichfield, respectively.

Reformation
The entire structure of the monastic and cathedral system was overthrown and reconstituted during the Reformation. Cathedrals which were once Roman Catholic came under the governance of the Church of England.

All the English monastic cathedral chapters were dissolved by Henry VIII and, with the exceptions of Bath and Coventry, were re-founded by him as churches of secular chapters, with a dean as the head, and a certain number of canons ranging from twelve at Canterbury and Durham to four at Carlisle, and with certain subordinate officers as minor canons, gospellers, epistolers, etc. The precentorship in these churches of the "New Foundation", as they are called, is not, as in the secular churches of the "Old Foundation", a dignity, but is merely an office held by one of the minor canons.

Henry VIII also created six new cathedrals from old monastic establishments, in each case governed by secular canons. Of these, Westminster did not retain its cathedral status. Four more of England's large historic churches were later to become cathedrals: Southwell, Southwark, Ripon, and St Albans Abbey.

Roles within the Cathedral

Details of cathedrals and their foundation

Ancient cathedrals
The medieval Church of England was organised into 17 dioceses. About half of the diocesan cathedrals were also monasteries, with the prior serving double duty as dean of the cathedral. The rest were served by a college of "secular" canons – non-monastic priests living under no fixed rule of life.  Both types often had Saxon foundations. Dioceses which exist in the Church of England today are indicated in bold type.

Pre-Conquest

Post-conquest

The Henrican Reorganisation
After Henry VIII's break with the Pope and the dissolution of the monasteries, the formerly monastic cathedrals were "re-founded" with secular canons. Furthermore, a number of new dioceses were formed, using some of the largest and finest of the other dissolved monasteries as cathedrals. Together, these two groups — the old monastic cathedrals and the new sees — were known as cathedrals of the New Foundation; the old cathedrals which had always been served by secular canons were known as those of the Old Foundation. Dioceses which exist in the Church of England today are indicated in bold type.

Colonial dioceses
During the British colonial era, the Anglican religion was exported to the colonies. From 1787 onwards, Church of England dioceses were founded in the colonies. A structure of provinces and metropolitans developed until, in 1863, the imperial Privy Council ruled that the English church hierarchy had no legal status in the colonies. Immediately prior to that point, the United Church of England and Ireland had a total of 82 dioceses worldwide.

From 1863 onwards, Anglican (former) colonial dioceses have been separate from and independent of the English church. Exceptionally, the Archbishop of Canterbury has retained (and retains to this day) some metropolitan jurisdictions outside England. Dioceses are listed by their name at creation and their present country, with only their cathedral(s) between creation and independence.

Irish dioceses
Between the 1801 Union and 1871 disestablishment, the Anglican dioceses of England and Ireland were united in one United Church of England and Ireland. As such, the Irish dioceses were, for a time, Church of England dioceses. Each diocese is listed with its cathedral(s) only during the United Church period.

Late modern foundations
No further cathedrals were founded until, in the mid 19th century, the huge population growth of north-central England meant that redistricting could no longer be ignored. Since then twenty new dioceses have been founded, each with a cathedral — some are great medieval monasteries or collegiate churches which were not elevated by Henry VIII but might well have been; others are glorified parish churches; and others are totally new constructions. In the following table, bold type indicates the creation of a new diocese, whilst plain type is used to indicate changes to existing dioceses.

Line of descent since St Augustine
There were archbishops in London, York and Caerleon and bishops in Lincoln before the 4th century. The following is a simplified breakdown of the creation of dioceses since St Augustine's 6th/7th century dioceses. It is simplified in that not every new diocese is formed from only one predecessor – they have often taken territory from two or more neighbouring dioceses. Today's dioceses are highlighted in bold type.

Canterbury – 597–present
Rochester – 604–present
Hertfordshire and Essex split off to form Diocese of St Albans, 1876–present
Essex split off to form Diocese of Chelmsford, 1914–present
London – 604–present
seat at St Paul's 604–1539
split into Diocese of Westminster (seat at Westminster Abbey), 1540–50
seats at St Paul's and Westminster Abbey, 1550–56
seat at St Paul's, 1556–present
Hertfordshire and Essex moved to Rochester, 1846
York – 625–present
Lindisfarne added (bishop of larger diocese also called "Bishop of Northumbria"), 664
larger diocese split in 678 to form:
Diocese of York
Archbishop, 735–present
split to create (with part of Lichfield-and-Coventry) the Diocese of Chester, 1541–present
Province of Canterbury until 1542; Province of York since
split to create (with part of York) new Diocese of Ripon, 1836–2014 (renamed Ripon and Leeds, 1999)
split to form Diocese of Wakefield, 1888–2014
split to form Diocese of Bradford, 1920–2014
Diocese of Leeds, created from former territory of dissolved dioceses of Ripon and Leeds, of Wakefield and of Bradford, 2014–present
split to form Diocese of Manchester, 1847–present
split to form Diocese of Blackburn, 1926–present
split to form Diocese of Liverpool, 1880–present
split to form Diocese of Sheffield, 1914–present
old Diocese of Ripon, 678 (reunited to York before 700)
Bernicia diocese (split 685)
Hexham diocese (two parts reabsorbed into York and Lindisfarne, 854)
Lindisfarne diocese (see below)
East Anglia/Norwich – c. 630–present
"Bishop of the East Angles", c. 630–672
seat at Soham, c. 630 (purportedly, briefly before transfer to Dunwich)
seat at Dunwich, c. 630–672
split into Elmham/Norwich diocese, 672–present
seat at Elmham, 673–1070
seat at Thetford, 1070–1094
seat at Norwich, 1094–present
split to form Dunwich diocese, 672–c. 950
suppressed and reunited to Elmham, c. 950
Dorchester (Wessex)/Diocese of Winchester, 634–present
seat at Dorchester-upon-Thames until c. 660–680
seat in flux c. 660–680
seat at Winchester since c. 660–680
split to form Selsey/Chichester diocese, 681–present
seat at Selsey, 681–685 & 706–1075
suppressed & absorbed by Winchester, 685–706
seat at Chichester since 1075
split off to form Sherborne/Salisbury diocese, 705–present
seat at Sherborne until 1075
seat at Old Sarum, 1075–1225
seat at New Sarum since 1225
split off to form Crediton/Exeter diocese, 905–present
seat at Tawton until c. 909
seat at Credition, c. 909–1050
seat at Exeter since 1050
absorbed Cornish see, 1027
split to form Diocese of Truro, 1876–present
split to form Ramsbury diocese, c. 909–1058
suppressed and reunited to Sherborne
split to form the Somerset diocese, c. 909–present
Diocese of Wells; seat at Wells, c. 909–1090
Diocese of Bath; seat at Bath, 1090–1197 & 1219–1245
Diocese of Bath and Glastonbury; seat at Glastonbury, 1197–1219
Diocese of Bath and Wells; equal seats at Bath and at Wells, 1245–1539
Diocese of Bath and Wells; seat at Wells, 1539–present
south London area given to Rochester, 1877–1905
similar area formed the Diocese of Southwark, 1905–present
split off to form Diocese of Portsmouth, 1927–present
split off to form Diocese of Guildford, 1927–present
Lindisfarne/Durham – 635–present
seat at Lindisfarne, 635–664 & 685–875
united to York, 664–678
united to Bernicia, 678–685
seat at Chester-le-Street, 875–995
seat at Durham, 995–present
called Prince-Bishop, c. 1071–c. 1836
split to form Diocese of Carlisle, 1133–present
split to form Diocese of Newcastle (upon Tyne), 1882–present
Lichfield – 656–present
Mercian diocese; seat at Repton, 656–669
Diocese of Lichfield; seat at Lichfield, 669–1075 & 1837–present
Archbishop of Lichfield, metropolitan over Worcester, Leicester, Lindsey, Hereford, Elmham and Dunwich, 786–796 (seized from Canterbury)
Old Diocese of Chester; seat at Chester, 1075–1102
for new Diocese of Chester, see above
Old Diocese of Coventry; seat at Coventry, 1102–1228 (co-cathedral at Chester 1102–?)
for new Diocese of Coventry, see below
Diocese of Coventry and Lichfield; seats both at Coventry and at Lichfield, 1228–1539
Diocese of Lichfield and Coventry; seat at Lichfield, 1539–1837
split to form Hereford diocese, 676–present
split to form Lindsey diocese, 678–c. 1010
suppressed and given to the Dorchester (Mercian) diocese, c. 1010 (see below)
split to form Worcester diocese, 680–present
split to form Gloucester diocese, 1541–1552 & 1554–present
Diocese of Gloucester; seat at Gloucester, 1541–1552, 1554–1836 & 1897–present
Diocese of Worcester and Gloucester; seats both at Worcester and at Gloucester, 1552–1554
Diocese of Gloucester and Bristol; seats both at Gloucester and at Bristol, 1836–1897
split to form Bristol diocese, 1542–present
suppressed and merged to Gloucester diocese, 1836–1897
split to form Birmingham diocese, 1905–present
split to form new Coventry diocese, 1918–present
split to form old Leicester/Dorchester (Mercian)/Lincoln diocese, 681–present
seat at Leicester, 681–878
seat at Dorchester-upon-Thames, 878–1072
seat at Lincoln, 1072–present
split to form Ely diocese, 1108–present
split to form the Diocese of St Edmundsbury and Ipswich, 1914–present
split to form Peterborough diocese, 1541–present
split to form new Leicester diocese, 1926–present
split to form Oxford diocese, 1542–present
seat at Osney, 1542
seat at Christ Church, 1542–present
some territory ceded to Worcester, 1837; some of which became Birmingham and Coventry dioceses, 1905 & 1918 (see above)
split to form Southwell diocese, 1884–present
Province of Canterbury until 1936; Province of York since
called Southwell and Nottingham since 2005
split to form Derby diocese, 1927–present
Old Cornish bishopric – c. 920–1027
See at St Germans
Called "Bishop of Cornwall" and "Bishop of St Germans"
Absorbed by Crediton (see above)Glamorgan area – c522–present (Wales)Bishop of (St) Teilo until before 1107
Under Canterbury's jurisdiction by 982
Bishop of Glamorgan (and Gwent), before 1107–1115
Diocese of Llandaff; Bishop of Llandaff; seat at Llandaff, 1115–present
Church in Wales since 1920
Bangor diocese – 546–present (Wales)Under Canterbury's jurisdiction by c. 1081
Church in Wales since 1920
St David's diocese – 545–present (Wales)Archbishop of St David's until 1115
Under Canterbury's jurisdiction by 1115
Church in Wales since 1920
St Asaph diocese – c. 583–present (Wales)''
Under Canterbury's jurisdiction by 1143
Church in Wales since 1920
Sodor and Man diocese received from Norwegian jurisdiction – c. 1400–present
Province of Canterbury until 1542; Province of York since
Europe diocese, 1842–present
Diocese of Gibraltar (over southern Europe), founded 1842
merged with London's continental jurisdictions (over northern and central Europe) and renamed Diocese of Gibraltar in Europe, 1980

See also

 Apostolicae curae
 Monasticism
 Architecture of the medieval cathedrals of England
 List of cathedrals in the United Kingdom
 Anglican Communion
 List of Church of England dioceses
 Gesta pontificum Anglorum

Notes

References

Further reading

External links
England and Wales Diocese boundaries in 1835 and 1850

History of Christianity in the United Kingdom
History of the Church of England
History
England